Henry II the Pious (1196 – 9 April 1241) was Duke of Silesia and High Duke of Poland as well as Duke of South-Greater Poland from 1238 until his death. Between 1238 and 1239 he also served as regent of Sandomierz and Opole–Racibórz. He was the son of Henry the Bearded and a member of the Silesian Piast dynasty. In October 2015, the Roman Catholic Diocese of Legnica opened up his cause for beatification, obtaining him the title of Servant of God.

Early life
Henry the Pious was the second son of High Duke Henry the Bearded of Poland and Hedwig of Andechs. His elder brother, Bolesław, died in 1206. In 1213, his younger brother Konrad the Curly died during a hunt, leaving the young Henry as the sole heir of Lower Silesia. Around 1218 his father arranged his marriage to Anne, daughter of King Ottokar I of Bohemia. This union with the royal Přemyslid dynasty allowed Henry the Pious to participate actively in international politics.

Henry the Bearded quickly designated his sole surviving son as his sole heir, and from 1222, the young prince countersigned documents with his father. By 1224, he had his own seal and notary. In 1227, during a meeting of Piast dukes in Gąsawa, Henry the Bearded and High Duke Leszek I the White were ambushed. Leszek was killed and Henry was seriously wounded. Henry the Pious acted as interim duke. In 1229, Henry the Bearded was captured by Duke Konrad I of Masovia, and again young Henry the Pious acted as interim duke. During 1229–30, he led a military expedition to recover and secure the possession of Lubusz Land, and in 1233–34 he actively supported his father's affairs in Prussia and Greater Poland. In 1234, Henry the Bearded named his son co-ruler. Later, Henry the Bearded took the duchies of Kraków and Silesia, and Henry the Pious was given the duchies of Silesia and Greater Poland. When Henry the Bearded died on 19 March 1238, Henry the Pious became duke of Silesia, Kraków and Greater Poland.

Sole reign
Henry the Pious inherited Lower Silesia from his father. Southern Greater Poland and Kraków were ruled by the Piast princes, although the late duke of Greater Poland and Kraków, Władysław III, had left all his lands to Henry the Bearded. The will was ignored by Duke Konrad of Masovia and Władysław's III nephew Władysław Odonic.

Henry II could retain his authority as a regent over the Upper Silesian Duchy of Opole-Racibórz and the Duchy of Sandomierz during the minority of their rulers Mieszko II the Fat and Bolesław V the Chaste. Nevertheless, in 1239, Henry was compelled to resign the regency, although he remained on good terms with the Dukes of Opole and Sandomierz, and managed to retain Greater Polish Kalisz and Wieluń.

The situation in the northwest was more complicated: Margrave Otto III of Brandenburg took the important Greater Polish fortress at Santok and besieged Lubusz. Henry II also inherited the disputes with Konrad of Masovia, Władysław Odonic, and with the Church, led by Pełka, Archbishop of Gniezno. The situation changed unexpectedly after the death of Władysław Odonic on 5 June 1239, who left two minor sons, Przemysł I and Bolesław the Pious. Henry II took the majority of Odonic's possessions (including Gniezno), leaving Nakło nad Notecią and Ujście to Odonic's sons.

Henry then abandoned the traditional alliance of his family with the Imperial House of Hohenstaufen and supported Pope Gregory IX, immediately resolving his dispute with the Church. He then put an end to his conflicts with Konrad of Masovia by arranging the marriages of two of his daughters to two of Konrad's sons: Gertrude to Bolesław, and Constance, to Casimir I of Kuyavia. In 1239, Henry II reclaimed the Santok fortress from Margrave Otto III after Henry's victory in the Battle of Lubusz.

Mongol invasion

In the East, a new dangerous opponent appeared: the Mongols, under the leadership of Batu Khan, who, after the invasion of Rus' chose the Kingdom of Hungary as his next target. Batu Khan realized that he had to take control of Poland before he could take Hungary. In January 1241, Batu sent reconnaissance troops to Lublin and Zawichost. The invasion was launched a month later, by an army of 10,000 men under the leadership of Orda. In Lesser Poland the Mongols met weaker resistance, defeating and killing almost all the Kraków and Sandomierz nobility in the Battle of Tursko (13 February), and the Battles of Tarczek and Chmielnik (18 March), including the voivode of Kraków, Włodzimierz and the castellan Klement of Brzeźnica. All of Lesser Poland, including Kraków and Sandomierz, fell into the hands of the Mongols.

Henry did not wait for the promised aid from Western rulers and began to concentrate the surviving troops of Lesser Poland and his own Silesian and Greater Poland forces in Legnica. Europe's rulers were more focused on the struggle between the Holy Roman Empire and Papacy, and they ignored Henry's requests for help. The only foreign troops who joined him were those of King Wenceslaus I of Bohemia and the combined forces of some Knights Templar. Some sources report that European forces halted their troops near Legnica, probably fearing that the Christian Army would become an easy prey to the Mongols. The battle of Legnica took place on 9 April 1241. Henry was defeated and killed in action.

The defeat was widely blamed on the European monarchs, especially Emperor Frederick II and King Béla IV of Hungary, who had refused to help, and the unexpected retreat from the battle by Henry's Upper Silesian cousin Mieszko II the Fat, through a trick of the Mongols. There are two descriptions of Henry's death, one submitted by Jan Długosz (today considered dubious), and the second by C. de Brigia in his Historii Tartatorum (based on reports of direct witnesses, now considered more reliable). However, the Mongols did not intend to occupy the country, and shortly afterward they went through Moravia to Hungary, wanting to connect with the main army of Batu Khan. Henry's naked and decapitated body could only be identified by his wife, because of his polydactyly. He had six toes on his left foot, which was confirmed when his tomb was opened in 1832. Henry was buried in the crypt of the Franciscan Church of Sts. Vincent and Jacob in Wrocław (Breslau).

Despite ruling for only three years, Henry remained in the memories of Silesia, Greater Poland and Kraków as the perfect Christian knight, lord and martyr, whose brilliant career was abruptly ended by his early death. Upon his death, the line of the Silesian Piasts fragmented into numerous dukes of Silesia, who (except for Henry's grandson Henry IV Probus) were no longer able to prevail as Polish high dukes and subsequently came under the influence of the neighbouring Kingdom of Bohemia.

In 1944, Henry the Pious' body went missing after being taken from its tomb by German scientists for laboratory tests; they had hoped to prove that the prince was Aryan.

Marriage and children
Between 1214 and 1218, Henry married Anna (ca. 1201 –  23 June 1265), daughter of King Ottokar I of Bohemia. They had:
 Gertrude (1218/20 – 23/30 April 1244/47), married in 1232 to Bolesław I of Masovia.
 Constance (1221/27 – 1253/3 May 1257), married in 1239 to Casimir I of Kuyavia.
 Bolesław II the Bald (1220/25 – 26/31 December 1278).
 Mieszko (1223/27 – 1241/1242).
 Henry III the White (1222/30 – 3 December 1266).
 Elizabeth (1224/1232 – 16 January 1265), married in 1244 to Przemysł I of Greater Poland.
 Konrad (1228/31 – 6 August 1273/1274).
 Władysław (1237 – 27 April 1270, buried Salzburg Cathedral), Chancellor of Bohemia (1256), Bishop of Passau (1265) and Archbishop of Salzburg (1265–70).
 Agnes (123/1236 – 14 May after 1277), Abbess of St. Clara in Trebnitz.
 Hedwig (1238/41 – 3 April 1318), Abbess of St. Clara in Wrocław.

See also
 History of Poland (966–1385)
 Piast dynasty
 Dukes of Silesia
 History of Silesia

References

Sources

|-
| width="30%" align="center" rowspan="3"| Preceded byHenry I the Bearded
| width="40%" align="center" | High Duke of Poland1238–1241
| width="30%" align="center" rowspan="3" | Succeeded byBolesław II the Bald
|-
| width="40%" align="center" | Duke of Wrocław1238–1241
|-
| width="40%" align="center" | Duke of Greater Poland(Only in the Southwest) 1238–1241

1196 births
1241 deaths
13th-century Polish monarchs
People with polydactyly
Polish Roman Catholics
Polish Servants of God
Medieval nobility of the Holy Roman Empire
13th-century Polish people
Piast dynasty
Dukes of Greater Poland
Dukes of Wrocław
Polish military personnel killed in action
Christians of the Prussian Crusade
People of Byzantine descent
Monarchs killed in action